The 1999 South Lakeland District Council election took place on 6 May 1999 to elect members of South Lakeland District Council in Cumbria, England. The whole council was up for election with boundary changes since the last election in 1998. The council stayed under no overall control.

Election result

Ward results

References

1999
1999 English local elections
1990s in Cumbria